EHP may refer to:
 E.H.P., a 1920s French automobile manufacturer
 Eastern Highlands Province in Papua New Guinea
 EHP spectral sequence in mathematics
, Labourist Movement Party, a political party in Turkey
 Environmental Health Perspectives, a scholarly journal
 Environmental Planning & Historic Preservation (EHP), a Federal Emergency Management Agency (FEMA) program
 Everglades Holiday Park, in Fort Lauderdale, Florida
 Sahrawi peseta, the de facto currency of the Sahrawi Arab Democratic Republic
 Electron-Hole Pairs, the fundamental unit of generation and recombination in semiconductors